The University of Music Franz Liszt Weimar (in German: Hochschule für Musik Franz Liszt Weimar) is an institution of music in Weimar, Germany.

The Hochschule
Franz Liszt, who spent a great deal of his life in Weimar, encouraged the founding of a school in 1835 for the education of musicians in orchestral instruments. It was his student Carl Müllerhartung who realized Liszt's dream, founding the university on 24 June 1872.

Campus 
The university is located in several different buildings in the centre of Weimar.

Courses
The university offers courses in all musical disciplines, including composition, conducting, jazz, musical theatre and pedagogy at undergraduate and postgraduate level.

People

Some notable former students

 David Afkham (conductor)
 Andreas Bauer Kanabas (bass)
 Tatyana Ryzhkova (classical guitarist)
 Wolfgang Unger (choral conductor)
 Lorenzo Viotti (conductor)
 Ekkehard Wlaschiha (baritone)
 Sylke Zimpel (composer and choral conductor)

Some notable present and former staff

Waldemar von Baußnern
Ricardo Gallen
Gunter Kahlert
Erhard Mauersberger
Dorothee Mields
Robin Minard
Michael Obst
Nicolás Pasquet
Jürgen Rost
Monika Rost
Manfred Schmitz
Klaus Storck
Richard Wetz

See also
Music schools in Germany

External links
Official Website (in English)

 
Music schools in Germany
Education in Weimar
Public universities and colleges in Germany
Franz Liszt
Educational institutions established in 1872
1872 establishments in Germany
Universities and colleges in Thuringia